The Lancang River Railway Bridge is an arch bridge under construction od Dali-Ruili Railway near city of Baoshan in western Yunnan Province, China. The bridge's main span will be  making it also one of the longest arch bridges ever built. The bridge is expected to be completed in 2019.

Design 

Instead of using cable stays and tiebacks to build the arch, the two steel truss arch halves were built vertically on either side of the canyon slopes on top of scaffolding. While still in a vertical position, the two halves were then lowered over the gorge where they were connected at the crown. The total length of the bridge is 698 meters.

Site 
The site showcases three high spans including an older suspension bridge, the new railway bridge and a high pipeline suspension bridge that is the third-highest of its type in the world after the Hegigio Gorge Pipeline Bridge in Papua New Guinea and the Niouc Bridge in Switzerland.

The official height of the bridge is 271 meters, measured to the river's original surface. The construction of the Xiaowan Dam downstream created a reservoir that extends back under the bridge and raised the water level some 50 meters.

See also
List of highest bridges in the world
List of crossings of the Mekong River
List of longest arch bridge spans

References

Bridges in Yunnan
Arch bridges in China
Buildings and structures under construction in China
Bridges over the Mekong River
Bridges under construction
Transport in Baoshan, Yunnan
Transport in Dali Bai Autonomous Prefecture